François-Charles Oberthür (1818, Strasbourg – 1893) was the founder of the French printing group Imprimerie Oberthur (fr). In Strasbourg, François-Charles, an engraver, ran a printing press, with Alois Senefelder, the inventor of lithography. He moved to Rennes in 1838, qualified as a lithographer in 1842 and then founded a printing company, with a partner. He became the sole owner in 1855, calling his enterprise the Imprimerie Oberthür. 

Imprimerie Oberthür was the exclusive printer for Compagnie des Chemins de Fer de l'Ouest (Western Railway Company), published the first French telephone directory publisher and the "Almanach des Postes" Post Office almanac. These became a huge success, bringing cheap but very high quality art printing to many thousands of families across France. The press also specialized in colour plates featuring flowers, butterflies and beetles. François-Charles Oberthür also devised the French standard reference for tints.

He was an amateur entomologist specialising in Lepidoptera especially Zygaenidae and Lycaenidae. He had two sons
René Oberthür and Charles Oberthür. Both became entomologists. 
The Oberthur house, n° 82 de la rue de Paris, is preserved in Rennes and a "jardin anglais" in Rennes is named for him.

See also 
 Oberthur Technologies, a modern French company created after partitioning and regrouping of original Imprimerie Oberthur.

References
Combert, Y. 2004 René Oberthür (1852–1944) et sa collection. Le Coléoptériste, 7 (2):111-116.
René Oberthür and Henri Dautheney, 1905 Répertoire des Couleurs pour aider à la détermination des couleurs des Fleurs, des Feuillages et des Fruits. La Société Française des Chrysantèmistes. Oberthür, Rennes Oberthür, 82 pp + 365 colour plates.
David, Fernand, 1925 Ministre du Commerce, de l'Industrie, des Postes et des Telegraphes. Librarie Larousse Paris.

External links
History of Oberthur printing

1818 births
1893 deaths
Businesspeople from Strasbourg
French lepidopterists
French printers
19th-century French businesspeople